Reverend Edward W. Clayborn (March 10, 1880-January 1978) was an American musician, known as the "Guitar Evangelist". He sang a form of blues gospel similar to Blind Willie Johnson. Clayborn recorded forty songs, for Vocalion Records between 1926 and 1930. In The Ganymede Takeover, the San Franciscan author Philip K. Dick, a record enthusiast, has a character state that "True Religion", sung by Clayborn was one of the first jazz recordings.

Clayborn was born in Richmond, Alabama. The year he was born is disputed, with March 10, 1880 being the birthdate given on his WWII draft registration card.

He became a minister at St.Luke's Baptist Church in Pittsburgh, PA. He died in January 1978 in Pittsburgh, PA.

References

American blues singers
American gospel singers
American male singers
1880 births
1978 deaths